A constitutional referendum was held in the Comoros on 17 May 2009. The constitutional amendments were approved with 93.9% in favour, with a turnout of 51.8%.

Background
President Ahmed Abdallah Mohamed Sambi proposed extending his term for two years in order to hold all elections simultaneously in 2011, as well as to reform the constitutional structure of the Comoros to save money. However, opposition parties and those from other islands were opposed to this, seeing it as a ploy to extend his term of office at the expense of the other two islands. Other constitutional amendments would make Islam the state religion and downgrade the status of the presidents of the constituent islands to governors, as well as allowing the president to dissolve the Assembly of the Union.

The referendum was originally scheduled for 22 March 2009, but was postponed due to disagreements over the content.

Results

References

2009 referendums
2009
2009 in the Comoros
Constitutional referendums in the Comoros